San Felipe volcanic field (also known as the Santa Ana Mesa field) is a monogenetic volcanic field located just north of the confluence of the Jemez River and the Rio Grande in New Mexico, US.

Description
The volcanic field consists of tholeiitic basalt lava flows, most of which were erupted from fissures and vents aligned from north to south.

In addition to San Felipe volcano, three other major eruption centers and 66 cinder cones have been identified in the field. The cinder cones are unusual in being eroded nearly flat or even appearing as shallow craters on the flow surfaces. This is attributed to the nearby rivers meandering across the flows after the cinder cones erupted, but before regional uplift raised the field above river level. Some of the cinder cones show ring dikes. Small dikes and plugs are found across the field that are attributed to a late stage of eruption.

Notable Vents

See also
 List of volcanoes in the United States

References

Volcanic fields of New Mexico
Pliocene volcanism
Monogenetic volcanic fields
Landforms of Sandoval County, New Mexico